Danielle Galligan (born 1 December 1992) is an Irish actress, theatre maker, and poet. On television, she is known for her role in the Netflix series Shadow and Bone (2021–). She was nominated for an IFTA for her performance in the film Lakelands (2022).

Early life and education
Galligan is from Rathfarnham, a suburb in South Dublin. Her mother Lorraine is a beauty therapist who runs a salon and beauty school. Galligan was raised Catholic but now considers herself agnostic.

Galligan attended Loreto High School Beaufort. She was a member of Ann Kavanagh's Young People's Theatre from 2005 to 2011 and was awarded the Ena Burke bursary for the Betty Ann Norton Theatre School. She then studied Drama and Theatre studies at Trinity College Dublin and trained in Acting at The Lir Academy, graduating with a bachelor's degree in 2015.

Career

Theatre
After graduating from The Lir, Galligan began her career in stage productions such as The Train with the Rough Magic Theatre Company. In 2017, she was in All Honey and played the titular role in The Grimm Tale of Cinderella.

In 2018, Galligan played the lead opposite Tom Moran in his play Lyrics and Cinnamon in We Can’t Have Monkeys in the House at the New Theatre. She reprised the latter role at the 2019 Young Curators Festival. She featured as the singer in Gavin Kostick's 12 Christmas Poems that December.

Theatre making
Galligan had a FUEL theatre making residency and workshop alongside Fionnuala Gygax and Ailish Leavy for Hostel 16 at the Druid Theatre.

In 2018, she co-founded Chaos Factory, an experimental theatre company alongside Gygax, Venetia Bowe, and Rachel Bergin. They debuted with a production titled Kiss Kiss Slap, which featured in the 2018 Dublin Fringe Festival. Their second project, MorphMe, premiered in April 2019.

That same year, Galligan began working as an actor-deviser for Murmuration, which debuted with Summertime starring her and Finbarr Doyle. The show featured at the 2018 Dublin Fringe Festival, where the pair were shortlisted for Best Duo, as well as the 2019 Drogheda Arts Festival and Abbey Theatre Young Curators Festival.

She was the dramaturg for Aisling O'Mara's Nothing But A Toerag in January 2019.

Galligan participated in a podcast with RISE Productions in which she, Gavin Kostick, Éanna Hardwicke, and Janet Moran performed Kostick's modern version of Homer's Odyssey. Galligan and Kostick, having worked on the project since 2017, co-created and performed in Gym Swim Party, a choreography production inspired by his take on the epic in association with O'Reilly Theatre. The production featured in the 2019 Dublin Fringe Festival.

Television and film
In her early career, Galligan featured in short films such as Strangers in the Park, Pernicio, Beautiful Youth, and Break Us. She won best actress at the Short+Sweet Film Festival and best duo alongside Mark Lawrence at the 6 on Nebraska Film Festival for Strangers in the Park, which she co-wrote. She received nominations from the Richard Harris Film Festival and the Underground Cinema Festival for her role in Pernicio.

Galligan made her television debut in 2019 with guest roles in Game of Thrones and Krypton. She landed her first major television role as Nina Zenik in the Netflix series Shadow and Bone, an adaptation of fantasy book series The Grisha Trilogy and the Six of Crows Duology by Leigh Bardugo, which premiered in 2021. Galligan made her feature film debut as Naomi in Who We Love, a remake of the 2016 short film Lily.

Other media
Galligan has participated in RTÉ radio dramas such as The Playboy of the Western World and Hecuba by Marina Carr.

Filmography

Film

Television

Music videos

Stage

Audio

Awards and nominations

Notes

References

External links
 
 Danielle Galligan at Spotlight

Living people
1992 births
21st-century Irish actresses
Actresses from County Dublin
Irish agnostics
Irish stage actresses
Irish television actresses
Irish radio actresses
People from Rathfarnham
Theatre practitioners